Syed Ashik Rahman is the chief executive officer of RTV. He is also the editor-in-chief of the news portal RTV Online, and the publisher and editor of Look At Me, a monthly magazine on fashion and lifestyle.  He is also the director of Bengal Multimedia Ltd  from 2018 to Till now. There are a significant number of notable films and dramas he has produced. He won the National Film Award-2020 for his documentary titled Bangabandhur Rajnoitik Jibon o Bangladesher Obbhyudoy.

Host 
Syed Ashik Rahman is the host and moderator of RTV's popular talk show Unnayane Bangladesh (Bangladesh of development), Star of Politics, Diplomatic Zone, Forth Right, Business Talk and Kemon Chai Bangladesh (What kind of Bangladesh do you want?).

Film Producer 
Ashik Rahman has made significant contributions to film production since 2018. The variety of his films and the style of production have made him popular both within the country and abroad. 'Janmabhoomi', a film directed by Prasoon Rahman about the Rohingya refugee crisis, premiered at the United Nations Headquarters in 2018. Among his 2019 productions are the family drama Jodi Ekdin (If One Day), directed by Muhammad Mostafa Kamal Raj, and the thriller Sapudu, directed by Golam Sohrab Dodul. In January 2020, Debashish Biswas' Sawsur Bari Zindabad-2 was censored. During the centennial of the birth of Bangabandhu Sheikh Mujibur Rahman and the 50th anniversary of the independence of Bangladesh in 2021, a film entitled "Political life of Bangabandhu and the rise of Bangladesh" directed by Sabab Ali Arju got censored.

Book and Publications 
 “Bramon Bramia Shese (Story after a long travel)”

Awards 
He won the 'Global Brand Excellence Award' as the 'CEO of the Year'. The award was presented to him on November 3, 2017, at a lavish ceremony at the Sheraton Grand Jakarta Garden City Hotel in Indonesia.

References 

Living people
Year of birth missing (living people)